Roser Amadó i Cercós (born 22 January 1944 in Barcelona) is a Spanish architect.

Biography 
She studied at the Higher Technical School of Architecture of Barcelona, with Lluís Domènech i Girbau.

She was responsible for the conversion of the Fundació Antoni Tàpies (1986-1990)  and the new headquarters of the Archive of the Crown of Aragon (1990-1993 ). They were also the project managers of the historic center of Lleida (1981-1984), consisting of the Palace of Justice, the elevator Canyeret, the Cervantes school and Marius Torres park.

In 1992, for the Olympic Games in Barcelona, she designed in the La Vila Olímpica del Poblenou, the Eurocity 1 office building (1989-1992).

Other works include residential building Street Rec Comtal 20, Barcelona ( 1982–1985), the headquarters of Air Products SA (1990-1994), the storage vessel Honda in Santa Perpetua de Mogoda (1992-1993), a block of 240 homes in the Machinist (1999-2000), the Chic & Basic Hotel in Amsterdam (2006-2007), the House traffic lights and the police headquarters in El Prat de Llobregat (2006-2009) and Nuria Espert Theatre in Sant Andreu de la Barca (2004-2010).

In 2001, she founded the firm B01 Arquitectes with Lluís Domènech, Ramon Domènech, Carles Cortadas, Sander Laudy and Laura Pérez.

References

External links

"Arquitectura para después de una guerra" via El Pais 

1944 births
Architects from Catalonia
Spanish women architects
People from Barcelona
Living people